Scutellerinae is a subfamily of shield-backed bugs erected by Leach in 1815.

Tribes and Genera
BioLib lists the following genera in two tribes:

Scutellerini

Auth. Leach, 1815

 Anoplogonius Stål, 1873
 Augocoris Burmeister, 1835
 Bathistaulax Bergroth, 1912
 Brachyaulax Stål, 1871
 Calidea Laporte de Castelnau, 1832
 Calliphara Germar, 1839
 Cantao Amyot & Audinet-Serville, 1843
 Choerocoris Dallas, 1851
 Chrysocoris Hahn, 1834
 Cosmocoris Stål, 1865
 Cryptacrus Mayr, 1864
 Eucorysses Amyot & Audinet-Serville, 1843
 Fitha Walker, 1867
 Gonaulax Schouteden, 1903
 Graptocoris Stål, 1865
 Graptophara Stål, 1865
 Heissiphara Cassis & Vanags, 2006
 Lamprocoris Stål, 1864
 Lampromicra Stål, 1873 - jewel bug
 Nissania Lehmann, 1922
 Notacalliphara Lyal, 1979
 Paracalliphara Lyal, 1979
 Poecilocoris Dallas, 1848
 Procilia Stål, 1865
 Scutellera Lamarck, 1801
 Scutiphora Guérin-Méneville, 1831
 Tetrarthria Dallas, 1851

Sphaerocorini

Auth. Stål, 1873
 Chiastosternum Karsch, 1895
 Hyperoncus Stål, 1871
 Sphaerocoris Burmeister, 1835
 Steganocerus Mayr, 1864

References

External links
 
 

Scutellerinae
Hemiptera subfamilies
Shield bugs